Powhite Park is a 100-acre park in the city limits of Richmond, Virginia. It is close to the junction of Powhite parkway, Chippenham Parkway and Jahnke road. This park is notable for its pristinity and  beaver dam, considering the park is in city limits. The park is also populated by deer. The bike trail is considered moderate.

References

External links
 Richmond Times Dispatch Report on the park.

Parks in Richmond, Virginia